Leonhart may refer to:

 Leonhart (surname)
 Squall Leonhart, a character from the video game Final Fantasy VIII
 Leonhart Fuchs, a German physician and botanist, b. 1501

See also 

 Leon Hart (disambiguation)